Midway is an unincorporated community in Leake County, Mississippi, United States.

Geography 

References

Unincorporated communities in Leake County, Mississippi
Unincorporated communities in Mississippi